Jeff Glass (born November 19, 1985) is a Canadian professional ice hockey goaltender who is currently playing for the San Diego Gulls of the American Hockey League (AHL). Glass was selected by the Ottawa Senators in the 3rd round (89th overall) of the 2004 NHL Entry Draft. He joined their minor league affiliate and played several years with the organization before leaving as a free agent to join Barys Astana in 2009. He made his long-awaited NHL debut in the 2017–18 season with the Chicago Blackhawks.

Playing career
Glass spent his junior career with the Kootenay Ice of the Western Hockey League (WHL), spending three seasons with the team from 2002–2005. At the conclusion of the 2004–05 season, Glass won the Del Wilson Trophy as the WHL's top goaltender, was named to the WHL First All-Star team, and was named CHL Goaltender of the Year as the best goaltender in Canadian major-junior hockey. That year, Glass was also named starting goaltender for Canada at the 2005 World Junior Championships in North Dakota. Glass went 5–0 with a 1.40 goals against average (GAA), backstopping Canada to its first gold medal at the tournament since 1997.

Glass was drafted by the Ottawa Senators in the third round, 89th overall, of the 2004 NHL Entry Draft. After his stellar 2004–05 campaign, he signed a three-year entry level contract with the Senators. He spent the majority of the 2005–06 season with the Senators' ECHL affiliate, the Charlotte Checkers, before securing a full-time job with the Senators' top minor-league affiliate, the American Hockey League's Binghamton Senators, in 2006–07. For the next three seasons Glass shared time in Binghamton with Kelly Guard and Brian Elliott, compiling a record of 42–67–9.

After the 2008–09 season, Glass became a free agent and on August 30, 2009, he signed an undisclosed deal with the KHL's Barys Astana. Glass had a stellar 2009–10 campaign with Astana, posting a 19–11–4 record with a 2.87 GAA and .918 save percentage. Astana lost its first round playoff series to the eventual Gagarin Cup champions, Ak Bars Kazan.

Glass signed with Spartak Moscow before the 2013–14 season, however due to team financial problems he was sold to CSKA Moscow in January 2014. On July 9, 2014, Glass signed as a free agent to a one-year contract with Lada Togliatti.

He signed with another KHL team for the 2015–16 campaign, joining Dinamo Minsk. In December 2015, he represented Team Canada at the Spengler Cup and helped capture the title.

On August 26, 2016, Glass having returned to North America after 7 seasons in the KHL, signed with the Toronto Maple Leafs on a professional try-out contract to attend training camp. On September 27, 2016, he was reassigned by the Maple Leafs to attend affiliate, the Toronto Marlies training camp in the AHL. He ended up being released from the Marlies and on January 10, 2017 signed a contract to play for the Rockford IceHogs, affiliate to the Chicago Blackhawks. Glass appeared in 10 games with the IceHogs, before he was signed to a two-year, two-way NHL contract with the Blackhawks on February 23, 2017. On March 3, 2017, Glass was recalled by the Blackhawks to back up Corey Crawford against the New York Islanders.

On December 29, 2017, Glass made his NHL debut in a 4–3 win over the Edmonton Oilers.

On September 3, 2018, Glass agreed to attend hometown club, the Calgary Flames' training camp on a professional tryout. After attending camp he was released from his tryout during pre-season. He secured a contract for the 2018–19 season, on October 4, 2018, signing to one-year AHL contract with the Toronto Marlies. Glass appeared in 10 games with the Marlies for 3 wins before he was traded to the San Diego Gulls as a part of an NHL transaction between the Toronto Maple Leafs and Anaheim Ducks on December 10, 2018.

Following a European season abroad in the Austrian Hockey League with the EHC Black Wings Linz, Glass returned to North America approaching the delayed 2020–21 season, securing a one-year contract in a return with the San Diego Gulls on January 11, 2021.

Career statistics

Regular season and playoffs

Awards and honours

References

External links
 

1985 births
Living people
Barys Nur-Sultan players
Binghamton Senators players
EHC Black Wings Linz players
Canadian ice hockey goaltenders
Charlotte Checkers (1993–2010) players
Chicago Blackhawks players
Crowsnest Pass Timberwolves players
HC CSKA Moscow players
HC Lada Togliatti players
HC Sibir Novosibirsk players
HC Spartak Moscow players
Kootenay Ice players
Ottawa Senators draft picks
Rockford IceHogs (AHL) players
Ice hockey people from Calgary
Toronto Marlies players
Canadian expatriate ice hockey players in Russia